Bahçelievler Stadium is a stadium in the Yenibosna district of Bahçelievler, Istanbul, Turkey. It is the home stadium of Yenibosna Spor Kulübü and İstanbulspor A.Ş. The stadium's only stand (the north stand) is a covered all-seater which holds a total capacity of 4,100 people.

Nearby
Turkey Expert, Kuşadası Bazaar, Historical Kusadasi City Walls

References

Football venues in Turkey
Sports venues in Istanbul